Orange Egypt, formerly known as Mobinil, is the oldest mobile network operator in Egypt, founded on March 4, 1998. Orange provides voice and data exchange services, as well as 4G, 3G, ADSL and broadband internet.

Network and coverage 

Orange Egypt has:
 99,299 sites;
 36 switches;
 4503 mobile BTSs.

Orange was the first mobile carrier in Egypt to extend its network services to underground stations, having installed 17 Micro BTSs covering stations in Cairo in addition to the Al Azhar Tunnel.

Orange has international roaming agreements with 348 operators in 135 countries, being the first in Egypt to establish roaming agreements with the US and Canada, as well as non-GSM operators in South American countries including Argentina, Brazil and Peru.

Orange Egypt offers roaming with satellite operators such as Al-Thuraya.

Orange claims that its coverage extends to more than 99% of the Egyptian population.

Orange is continually ranked as the fastest network in Egypt by Speedtest and the National Telecom Regulatory Authority. According to the latter, Orange Egypt provides an average speed of 32 Mbit/s.

Market share 
As of October–December, 2017, Orange has about 33.5 million
active subscribers from almost 101.27 million mobile subscribers in Egypt.

Recent changes 
On September 21, 2011, Yves Gauthier was appointed chief executive officer (CEO) of Mobinil, a change that took effect on November 15 of the same year. This followed the resignation of Hassan Kabbani.

On February 13, 2012, Orange S.A. announced its intent to buy Sawiris' biggest share in Mobinil for about US$2 billion, which could be the end of the long-standing dispute between the company's major shareholders.

On May 27, 2012, Orange S.A. acquired 94 percent of Mobinil, buying most of the shares it did not already own from its local venture partner, Orascom Telecom Media and Technology (OTMT). Orange executed its purchase of 93.9 million shares of the 100 million outstanding at a pre-agreed price of LE 202.50 each, for a total transaction value of LE 19 billion (US$3.15 billion). OTMT agreed to keep a 5 percent stake in Mobinil.

In February 2015, an agreement was reached between Orange S.A. and OTMT, where OTMT, then holder of 5% of Mobinil's shares, sold all of its shares and voting rights in the company to Orange S.A., thus raising Orange's ownership in Mobinil to 98.92%.

On March 8, 2016, Mobinil was officially rebranded to Orange.

On October 14, 2016, Orange acquired the fourth-generation (4G) internet services licence after signing a $484-million agreement with the national telecom regulator.

By late 2016, Orange started offering 4G internet services.

On May 1, 2018, Yasser Shaker was appointment as the CEO of Orange Egypt.

On June 26, 2018, Orange announced that they would be providing new 4G+ internet services to their users.
 
On March 27, 2019, Home VDSL launches at speeds of up to 100 Mb, and launch something innovative by subscribing through Jumia.

Disputes 
In November 2017, Orange Egypt have reached a final and mutual agreement with Telecom Egypt over disputes related to interconnection, infrastructure and international gateway services.

See also 
 Telecom Egypt
 Vodafone Egypt
 Etisalat Egypt

References

External links 
 

Orange S.A.
Mobile phone companies of Egypt
Telecommunications companies established in 1998
Companies based in Cairo